Social Intercourse is a solo album by Ratt singer Stephen Pearcy.

Track list
 I Gotta Be Me
 Can't Ever Get Enough
 Freak
 In Like Pink
 Ya Gotta Love That
 In The Corner
 Turn It Upside Down
 Live To Die
 Ya Talkin' To Me
 Five Fingers
 Rock Kandy

Stephen Pearcy albums
2002 debut albums